Leiper is a surname. People with the surname include:

 Charles Leiper Grigg (1868–1940), the inventor of Bib-Label Lithiated Lemon-Lime soda, better known by its later name, 7 Up
 Dave Leiper (David Paul Leiper, born 1962), a relief pitcher with Major League Baseball's Oakland Athletics
 George Gray Leiper (1786–1868), a member of the U.S. House of Representatives from Pennsylvania
 Henry Smith Leiper (1891–1975), a missionary
 Jack Leiper (John Morton Leiper, 1921—2006), an English cricketer
 Jack Leiper (baseball) (1867–1960), an American professional baseball player
 Joe Leiper, Scottish footballer
 Jeff Leiper, the current Ottawa city councillor for Kitchissippi Ward
 Moira Leiper Ducharme, the first female mayor of Halifax, Nova Scotia (1991–1994)
 Robert Leiper (born 1961), an English cricketer
 Robert Thomson Leiper (1881–1969), a British parasitologist and helminthologist
 Thomas Leiper (1745–1825), a Scottish American merchant and local politician who served in the American Revolutionary War
 Tim Leiper (Timothy Joseph Leiper, born 1966), an American professional baseball coach and manager
 William Leiper (1839-1916), a Scottish architect notable particularly for his domestic architecture in and around the town of Helensburgh

See also
 Leiper Canal, a canal that, in the nineteenth century, ran along Crum Creek in Delaware County, Pennsylvania
 Leiper's Fork, Tennessee, an unincorporated rural village in Williamson County, Tennessee
 Leiper Railroad, a horse drawn railroad that operated between 1810 and 1828 in what is now Nether Providence Township, Delaware County, Pennsylvania
 Leaper (disambiguation)
 Leeper (disambiguation)